Stephen Connor (born 27 January 1989) is an English footballer who plays for Airbus UK Broughton, and has also played for two other Welsh Premier League clubs The New Saints and Bangor City. He played for Partick Thistle whilst on loan from Premier League side Everton. His usual position is on the wing, but he is able to play as a striker to equally good effect.

A diminutive winger, Connor has established himself in the Everton Under 18 side and was a regular in the reserve team. In the summer of 2007, Connor signed for Scottish First Division side Partick Thistle on a six-month loan deal. He made his debut as a substitute in a 1–1 draw with Stirling Albion on 4 August. His spell at Partick was blighted by injury. On 15 May 2008 it was announced Everton would not be renewing his contract.

He subsequently moved into the Welsh league system joining The New Saints in January 2009 and made his debut for Bangor City in October that year. In August 2012 he joined Airbus UK Broughton.

International career
Connor represented the England U17 team in the 2005 Nordic Tournament.

References

External links
Stephen Connor's profile on EvertonFC.com
Stephen Connor's profile on PTFC.co.uk

1989 births
Living people
English footballers
Everton F.C. players
Partick Thistle F.C. players
Scottish Football League players
Cymru Premier players
Airbus UK Broughton F.C. players
Bangor City F.C. players
The New Saints F.C. players
England youth international footballers
Association football midfielders